Inzimakhi (Dargwa: Инзимахьи) is a rural locality (a selo) in Akushinsky Selsoviet, Akushinsky  District, Republic of Dagestan, Russia. The population was 1,383 as of 2010. There are 31 streets.

Geography 
Inzimakhi is located on the right bank of the Akusha River, 2 km southeast of Akusha (the district's administrative centre) by road. Karsha is the nearest rural locality.

References 

Rural localities in Akushinsky District